Hahót may refer to:
 Hahót, Zala, a village in Hungary
 Hahót (genus), a Hungarian noble family (including a list of people whose surname is Hahót)